The First Emperor is an opera in two acts with music by Tan Dun and a libretto written in English by Tan Dun and Ha Jin. The opera received its world premiere at the Metropolitan Opera at Lincoln Center in New York City on 21 December 2006, conducted by the composer with Plácido Domingo in the title role. It was broadcast live to hundreds of cinemas around the world on 13 January 2007 as part of the Met Live in HD season. The following year, EMI released this movie broadcast on DVD. The opera was a co-production between the Metropolitan Opera and the Los Angeles Opera and was described to be the most elaborate Metropolitan Opera production since War and Peace.

Background
The protagonist is the real-life emperor Qin Shi Huang, who unified China with force, erected part of the Great Wall, and was buried with his terracotta army. The story of the opera is based on the Records of the Grand Historian by Sima Qian (c.145 – 90 BC) and the screenplay of The Emperor’s Shadow by Wei Lu.

Tan Dun was first approached by the Met in 1996 to write an opera. After seeing the film The Emperor's Shadow, he settled on the theme of the First Emperor. Zhang Yimou, the production's stage director, had worked with Tan Dun on the movie Hero that also deals with emperor Qin, albeit at an earlier time. The world premiere production was estimated to cost in excess of US$2 million. In preparation, Met staff was instructed in Chinese, and workshops in the development of the opera were held in Shanghai, in part as a cost-saving measure. Eagerly anticipated, the opera has been described as "a high-stakes, cross-cultural gamble". Tan Dun noted in regard to working in the operatic form: 
“Opera will no longer be a Western form, as it is no longer an Italian form.”

Roles

Synopsis

Act 1 
Scene 1

The traditional music at the court displeases the Emperor; he envisions a new anthem that glorifies his rule. He believes that his childhood friend, the composer Gao Jianli, should be the person to compose the anthem. Jianli lives in Yan, a state that the emperor has not yet conquered, and he orders his General to subjugate Yan and to get Jianli. As a reward for a victory, the Emperor promises his crippled daughter, Princess Yueyang, to the General.

Scene 2

The General is successful, and Jianli is brought before the Emperor. Although the Emperor greets Jianli with friendship, Jianli is enraged and rejects him: his village was destroyed, and his mother was killed. He would rather die than compose an anthem for the emperor. Princess Yueyang admires his bravery.

Scene 3

The Princess convinces the Emperor to hand Jianli over to her if she is able to convince him to live on and write the anthem. Jianli refuses to eat, but when the Princess feeds him from her own mouth, his resistance is broken. They make love and she loses her virginity. The Princess cries he is hurting her legs and she realises she is no longer paralysed and can walk normally. The Emperor, who is overjoyed to see her cured and calls Jianli a miracle worker, soon recognizes the cause. He wants to kill Jianli for violating his daughter, but hesitates at this point to get his anthem.

Act 2
Scene 1

As Jianli instructs Princess Yueyang in music, he hears the slaves sing while they build the Great Wall. The Emperor appears and demands that his daughter honor his promise of marriage to General Wang Bi. Yueyang refuses; she would rather kill herself. The Emperor schemes asking Jianli to give her up temporarily. He expects the General to be killed in battle, and Jianli would be free afterwards to have his daughter. Jianli agrees and will complete the anthem.

Scene 2

At the imperial inauguration the Emperor encounters the ghost of Yueyang: she had committed suicide as she could not sacrifice her love for the benefit of the country. Next he meets the ghost of General Wang Bi telling him that he was poisoned by Jianli and warning him of Jianli’s vengeance. As the Emperor ascends towards his throne, Jianli emerges. Insane with grief about his lover’s death, he bites off his tongue and spits it out at the Emperor. The Emperor strikes him down to spare him a slow death. He moves on to his throne and now hears the anthem for the first time. It is the slaves’ song. He realizes that this is Jianli's revenge.

Instrumentation
 Woodwinds: 2 flutes (one doubling on an amplified bass flute), 2 oboes, 2 clarinets, 2 bassoons
 Brass: 3 horns, 3 trumpets, C trumpet, 2 trombones, tuba
 Percussion (4 percussionist + timpanist): timpani, Tibetan singing bowl
 2 harps, strings, ancient music instruments (minimum 7 players): large Chinese drums, pairs of stones, 15-string zheng (Chinese lute or Japanese koto), pitched ceramic chimes (pitched ceramic flower pots), waterphones, giant bell onstage

Recording

Note: "Cat:" is short for catalogue number by the label company.

First performances and reviews
The stage director of the first production was Chinese film director Zhang Yimou. The sets were designed by Fan Yue, with choreography devised by Dou Dou Huang and costumes created by Emi Wada.

Upon its premiere, the opera has received mixed reviews with some reviewers praising it for its lavish production design and performances, while others criticized it for its dullness and sheer length.  The Guardian wrote "everything is excellent apart from the music and the words...".  Despite the mixed critical reception, all of the subsequent performances through the 23 January 2007 remained sold out.  One article has suggested revisions to the opera.

References

External links
Metropolitan Opera official website features The First Emperor casts and synopsis 

Operas by Tan Dun
English-language operas
Opera world premieres at the Metropolitan Opera
2006 operas
Operas set in antiquity
Operas
Operas set in China
Qin dynasty in fiction
Operas based on films
Operas based on real people
Cultural depictions of Qin Shi Huang
Works by Ha Jin